AG-043 (АГ-043) was a Soviet compact fully automatic assault rifle or carbine chambered for the 5.45×39mm round, developed in 1975. The weapon is a derivative of the earlier and similar AO-31 which also is Simonov's adaption of the AK-47.

The AG-043 had folding stock; a version with fixed stock was given the designation AG-042. Both were designed by Simonov after the GRAU launched Project Modern intended to adopt a carbine capable of automatic fire, inspired by the US experience with XM177 in Vietnam. The Soviet contest for this design was won by Kalashnikov's AKS-74U.

See also 
 List of Russian weaponry
 List of assault rifles

References

External links 
 http://www.militaryparitet.com/nomen/russia/strel/ogneoru/data/ic_nomenrussiastrelogneoru/65/
 https://web.archive.org/web/20110928044749/http://legion.wplus.net/imgg.shtml?img=%2Fguide%2Farmy%2Fgu%2Fag043-1.gif

5.45×39mm assault rifles
Kalashnikov derivatives
Trial and research firearms of the Soviet Union